The Congress of State is the government of the Republic of San Marino. In conformity with Article 3 of the Declaration on the Citizens’ Rights it is politically answerable to the Grand and General Council.

Composed by a variable number of members, generally around 10, it is appointed by the Grand and General Council among its own members, who are elected by the population. Generally it lasts five years as the Council, but it can be forced to resign by a parliamentary vote of no confidence.

The three most relevant posts are the Secretary for Foreign Affairs, the Secretary for Internal Affairs and the Secretary for Finance, who are directly chosen by the Council. The other seven congressmen are indistinctly nominated, and they will receive their ministry later by the Congress itself.

The incumbent Congress is in office since December 2016 following the general election of the same year, which marked the victory of the centre-left coalition Adesso.sm with 58% of the votes at the second round.

The Congress of State decides on international policies for San Marino, as well as international treaties and agreements concerning general international policies and matters relevant for the State's security. It determines the general administrative policies by defining the relevant objectives and general programmes and by issuing the necessary general directives of the Public Administration, without prejudice to its autonomy recognised by law; Settles any conflicts among the Ministers concerning their attributions; Is entrusted with the legislative initiative by drafting the laws to be submitted to the Grand and General Council for their approval; Decides on any other matter concerning the implementation of the Government programme, unless otherwise provided for in law provisions. Adopts delegated decrees provided for in Article 3 bis, fifth paragraph of the Declaration on the Citizens’ Rights; In case of need and urgency, adopts decrees having force of law and subject to ratification by the Grand and General Council within three months, under penalty of nullity; Submits to the Great and General Council the annual and pluriannual budget law, as well as the relevant financial statements of the State and of State Corporations, accompanied by the necessary reports; Prepares and submits to the Great and General Council the Budget Law and the relevant decrees to be adopted in this field; Controls expenditure plans, as well as the single interventions, with a view to verifying their compliance with the approved budget and with the directives issued; Orders immediate execution, under its own responsibility, of urgent and unpostponable measures, which are subject to the preventive control in conformity with the provisions in force; Suspends the adoption of provisions by the competent Ministers in case they refer to political or administrative matters requiring an appropriate collegial decision; Proposes administrative provisions falling within the competence of the Great and General Council; and Adopts regulations concerning the forms and implementation modalities of laws, as well as the organisation and functioning of public offices in conformity with law provisions.

Positions
 Secretary of State for Foreign and Political Affairs
 Secretary of State for Internal Affairs and Civil Defense
 Secretary of State for Finance, Budget and Programming, Information and Relations with the State Philatelic and Numismatic Office
 Secretary of State for Education, Culture, University and Justice
 Secretary of State for Territory, Environment and Agriculture
 Secretary of State for Health and Social Security (San Marino)
 Secretary of State for Trade and Relations with the Town Council
 Secretary of State for Communication, Transport, Relations with the Azienda Autonoma di Stato for Services, Tourism and Sport
 Secretary of State for Industry and Crafts
 Secretary of State for Labour and Cooperation

Link
 Grand and General Council website (it.)

References

Government of San Marino